This is a list of cases reported in volume 260 of United States Reports, decided by the Supreme Court of the United States in 1922 and 1923.

Justices of the Supreme Court at the time of volume 260 U.S. 

The Supreme Court is established by Article III, Section 1 of the Constitution of the United States, which says: "The judicial Power of the United States, shall be vested in one supreme Court . . .". The size of the Court is not specified; the Constitution leaves it to Congress to set the number of justices. Under the Judiciary Act of 1789 Congress originally fixed the number of justices at six (one chief justice and five associate justices). Since 1789 Congress has varied the size of the Court from six to seven, nine, ten, and back to nine justices (always including one chief justice).

When the cases in volume 260 were decided the Court comprised the following nine members:

Notable cases in 260 U.S.

Zucht v. King
In Zucht v. King, 260 U.S. 174 (1922), the Supreme Court held that the school district of San Antonio, Texas, could constitutionally exclude students not vaccinated against smallpox from attending schools in the district.  This followed the Court's 1905 ruling in Jacobson v. Massachusetts, in which the Court "had settled that it is within the police power of a state to provide for compulsory vaccination".

Ozawa v. United States
In Ozawa v. United States,  260 U.S. 178 (1922), the Supreme Court found Takao Ozawa, a Japanese-American who was born in Japan but had lived in the United States for 20 years, ineligible for naturalization.  In 1914, Ozawa had filed for US citizenship under the Naturalization Act of 1906. This act allowed only "free white persons" and "persons of African nativity or persons of African descent" to naturalize. Ozawa did not challenge the constitutionality of the racial restrictions. Instead, he claimed that Japanese people should be properly classified as "free white persons".  The Court held that "the words 'white person' was only to indicate a person of what is popularly known as the Caucasian race", and so Japanese were not considered  "free white persons" within the meaning of the law.

Yamashita v. Hinkle
In Yamashita v. Hinkle,  260 U.S. 199 (1922), the Supreme Court upheld the constitutionality of the state of Washington's Alien Land Law. The law prohibited Asians from owning property. Washington's attorney general maintained that in order for Japanese people to fit in, their "marked physical characteristics" would have to be destroyed, that "the Negro, the Indian and the Chinaman" had already demonstrated assimilation was not possible for them. The U.S. Supreme Court heard the case, brought by Takuji Yamashita, and affirmed this race-based prohibition, citing its immediately prior issued decision in Takao Ozawa v. United States (described above). Washington's Alien Land Law would not be repealed until 1966.

Pennsylvania Coal Co. v. Mahon
In Pennsylvania Coal Co. v. Mahon,   260 U.S. 393 (1922), the Supreme Court held that whether a regulatory act constitutes a taking requiring compensation depends on the extent of diminution in the value of the property. The decision started the doctrine of regulatory taking. The Takings Clause originally applied only when the government physically seized or occupied property.  Prior to 1922, American courts followed a clear rule: regulation of land was not a taking.  Rather, it was simply an exercise of the government’s police power to protect the public health, safety, welfare, and morals.

Citation style 

Under the Judiciary Act of 1789 the federal court structure at the time comprised District Courts, which had general trial jurisdiction; Circuit Courts, which had mixed trial and appellate (from the US District Courts) jurisdiction; and the United States Supreme Court, which had appellate jurisdiction over the federal District and Circuit courts—and for certain issues over state courts. The Supreme Court also had limited original jurisdiction (i.e., in which cases could be filed directly with the Supreme Court without first having been heard by a lower federal or state court). There were one or more federal District Courts and/or Circuit Courts in each state, territory, or other geographical region.

The Judiciary Act of 1891 created the United States Courts of Appeals and reassigned the jurisdiction of most routine appeals from the district and circuit courts to these appellate courts. The Act created nine new courts that were originally known as the "United States Circuit Courts of Appeals." The new courts had jurisdiction over most appeals of lower court decisions. The Supreme Court could review either legal issues that a court of appeals certified or decisions of court of appeals by writ of certiorari. On January 1, 1912, the effective date of the Judicial Code of 1911, the old Circuit Courts were abolished, with their remaining trial court jurisdiction transferred to the U.S. District Courts.

Bluebook citation style is used for case names, citations, and jurisdictions.
 "# Cir." = United States Court of Appeals
 e.g., "3d Cir." = United States Court of Appeals for the Third Circuit
 e.g.,"D. Mass." = United States District Court for the District of Massachusetts
 "E." = Eastern; "M." = Middle; "N." = Northern; "S." = Southern; "W." = Western
 e.g.,"M.D. Ala." = United States District Court for the Middle District of Alabama
 "Ct. Cl." = United States Court of Claims
 The abbreviation of a state's name alone indicates the highest appellate court in that state's judiciary at the time.
 e.g.,"Pa." = Supreme Court of Pennsylvania
 e.g.,"Me." = Supreme Judicial Court of Maine

List of cases in volume 260 U.S.

Notes and references

External links
  Case reports in volume 260 from Library of Congress
  Case reports in volume 260 from Court Listener
  Case reports in volume 260 from the Caselaw Access Project of Harvard Law School
  Case reports in volume 260 from Google Scholar
  Case reports in volume 260 from Justia
  Case reports in volume 260 from Open Jurist
 Website of the United States Supreme Court
 United States Courts website about the Supreme Court
 National Archives, Records of the Supreme Court of the United States
 American Bar Association, How Does the Supreme Court Work?
 The Supreme Court Historical Society